The Republic of Korea (South Korea) first participated at the Paralympic Games in 1968, and has sent athletes to compete in every Summer Paralympic Games since then. South Korea has also participated in every Winter Paralympic Games since the 1992 Games.

With 343 medals, of which 126 gold, 108 silver and 109 bronze, South Korea (following the 2016 Summer Paralympics) has been ranked among the top twenty nations around the world in the all-time Paralympic Games medal tally.

Medals

Medals by Summer Games

Medals by Winter Sports

Medals by Summer Sport 
Source:

Medals by Winter Sport 
Source:

See also

 :Category:Paralympic competitors for South Korea
 South Korea at the Asian Para Games
 South Korea at the Olympics
 South Korea at the Asian Games

References